Kushalanagar or Kushalanagara is a city located in the Kodagu district of the Indian state of Karnataka. Surrounded by Kaveri river, it is the gateway to Kodagu district. It also serves as the headquarters of Kushalanagar Taluk. By population, Kushalanagar is the second largest town in Kodagu district after Madikeri and the fastest developing town in the district. Kushalnagar is an important commercial centre in Kodagu.tourism attraction were nisaraga dhama. Pushpagiri wildlife sanctuary  in somvarpet

Etymology

According to popular myth, the name was given by Hyder Ali who was camped there when he received news of the birth of his son Tipu and called it as Kushyal nagar (="town of gladness") But in reality, Tipu was born around 1750 while Hyder Ali entered Kodagu for the first time in the 1760s. After the British conquest of Coorg it was known as Fraserpet after Colonel James Stuart Fraser who was the Political Agent in Coorg around 1834.

Geography
It has an average elevation of 844 metres (2726 feet).

Kushalanagar is situated in the eastern part of Kodagu district. The town is generally flat, although a few areas are hilly. Kaveri river surrounds the town in all directions except the west. It is roughly 85 kilometres west of Mysuru, 220 kilometres west of Bengaluru and 170 kilometres east of Mangaluru.

Demographics
 India census, Kushalanagara had a population of 15,326. Males constitute 53% of the population and females 47%. Kushalanagar has an average literacy rate of 89.53%, higher than the state average of  75.36% male literacy is 82%, and female literacy is 73%. 12% of the population is under 6 years of age.

Kushalnagar along with its cluster of nearby villages including Mullusoge, Kudamangalore and Kudige form one of the most densely populated areas in the district with combined population of 39,393.

The conurbation of Kushalnagar measures nearly 35km2, making it largest urban settlement in the district.

Economy 
Kushalnagar is an important commercial centre in Kodagu. KIADB Industrial Area is located in Kudloor of Kushalnagar where multiple coffee processing industries are located.

Education 
Kushalanagara has an average literacy rate of 89%. The town has six private Schools, one government school (from kindergarten to degree), one polytechnic school, and city has one government engineering college affiliated to VTU. A Sainik School is located in the outrange of the town, where students receive military training.

Transport
Kushalnagar has one government bus station that serves all intrastate and interstate regions. The town is also accessible via from Bengaluru and Mysore via transportation services or self-driving cars. 
The nearest railway stations are K R Nagar at a distance of 60 km and Mysore at the distance of 85km 

There is no railway service in Kodagu. A railway line from Mysuru to Kushalnagar has been planned but has been opposed by environmental activists.  The nearest airport is at Mysore, and the nearest international airport is Kannur International Airport. The Airports Authority of India has proposed a construction of a new mini airport named Kushalnagar airport in the town to boost tourism from other parts of the state.

See also
 Madikeri
 Kaveri Nisargadhama
 Mangalore
 somvarpet
 virajpet

References

Cities and towns in Kodagu district